Zoran Zekić (born 29 April 1974) is a Croatian professional football manager and former player who played as a striker. He is the current manager of Prva HNL club Slaven Belupo.

Managerial career 
In 2010 Zekić was appointed manager of the local football club in Zagreb, Maksimir, which he coached until 2013. One year later he went to Moldova, where he coached Sheriff-2 Tiraspol in 2014, after which he became Sheriff Tiraspol manager. He won the double with Sheriff in the 2014–15 season, winning the Divizia Naţională and the national cup.

On 1 September 2015, Zekić was named as manager of Osijek in the Croatian Prva HNL, signing a three-year contract until June 2018. In the 2016–17 season, Osijek finished in the fourth position, being promoted to the 2017–18 UEFA Europa League qualifying rounds. Osijek drew Santa Coloma, Luzern and PSV Eindhoven. Osijek beat PSV with 2–0 on aggregate (0–1, 1–0), being promoted to the play-off round, where the club lost to Austria Wien on away goals. On 29 March 2019, following the poor performance of the club in the league, Zekić parted ways with Osijek.

On 30 April 2019, Zekić came back to Sheriff, becoming the club's new manager.

In 2021 he was appointed manager of Nemzeti Bajnokság I club Diósgyőri VTK. Zekić became the manager when Diósgyőr was at the bottom of the league. Surprisingly, Diósgyőr could beat both Ferencvárosi TC and Fehérvár FC away. 

On 31 August 2021, Zekić came back to Croatian top division football, signing as the new head coach of Slaven Belupo.

Managerial statistics

Honours

Player 
Kamen Ingrad
Druga HNL: 2000–01

Maccabi Haifa
Israeli Premier League: 2003–04

Manager 
Sheriff Tiraspol
Divizia Naţională: 2014–15
Moldovan Cup: 2014–15

References

External links
 
 HRnogomet.com 

1974 births
Living people
Sportspeople from Osijek
Association football forwards
Croatian footballers
NK Osijek players
HNK Cibalia players
SC Pfullendorf players
FK Sarajevo players
NK Kamen Ingrad players
NK Zadar players
Maccabi Haifa F.C. players
GNK Dinamo Zagreb players
NK Inter Zaprešić players
HNK Rijeka players
NK Istra 1961 players
HNK Segesta players
NK Moslavina players
NK Lučko players
NK Maksimir players
Croatian Football League players
Regionalliga players
Premier League of Bosnia and Herzegovina players
First Football League (Croatia) players
Israeli Premier League players
Croatian expatriate footballers
Expatriate footballers in Germany
Croatian expatriate sportspeople in Germany
Expatriate footballers in Israel
Croatian expatriate sportspeople in Israel
Expatriate footballers in Bosnia and Herzegovina
Croatian expatriate sportspeople in Bosnia and Herzegovina
Croatian football managers
FC Sheriff Tiraspol managers
NK Osijek managers
Diósgyőri VTK managers
NK Slaven Belupo managers
Moldovan Super Liga managers
Croatian Football League managers
Nemzeti Bajnokság I managers
Croatian expatriate football managers
Expatriate football managers in Moldova
Croatian expatriate sportspeople in Moldova
Expatriate football managers in Hungary
Croatian expatriate sportspeople in Hungary